Talisman is a board game by Games Workshop. There have been several attempts to adapt the board game into a video game since its introduction in 1983.

The first was a 1985 ZX Spectrum game, titled Talisman or The Talisman. It was developed by SLUG and produced by the board game's publisher, Games Workshop. Another attempt, by Big Rooster Games in 2008 was abandoned and was labeled "a misfire" by Games Workshop. In 2012, Nomad Games released Talisman: Prologue, a single-player game for Microsoft Windows and mobile platforms, and in 2013 Nomad released Talisman: Digital Edition which added multiplayer to the game, with several expansions also released. Talisman Origins was released in 2019 by Nomad Games.

1985 version

Talisman was released in 1985 for ZX Spectrum, developed by SLUG and published by Games Workshop. The game is a conversion of the Second Edition of the board game. It is a fantasy hybrid board/role-playing game, in which players moved across a text-based virtual board, fighting creatures, collecting items, and strengthening their characters through experience. The ultimate goal was to defeat the other players, typically by reaching the Crown of Command on the game board.

Reception
Trevor Mendham reviewed Talisman for White Dwarf #66, giving it an overall rating of 7 out of 10, and stated that "Overall, the presentation of Talisman is excellent and the graphics make it a pleasure to play. It will certainly appeal to Talisman fans lacking opponents, as the computer makes a very reasonable job of this." Richard Price of Sinclair User gave the game four out of five stars and said: "Even with four players it is unlikely that anyone will be bored as the action can be quite entertaining, even to watch. This gives The Talisman an edge over text-based multiple player games." Paul Coppins of Computer and Video Games gave it one out of ten and said: "[...] for me this Adventure is summed up in one word — poor!" Derek Brewster of Crash gave the game seven out of ten and said: "Talisman is a very complex strategy game with superb graphics and all the other trappings of a well designed and highly polished piece of software. Where the game really excels is in its offering entertainment for up to four players which is sufficiently complex to keep all interested for the duration. As with all involved strategy games it will take a while to get into it, but I think the time would be well spent as this game has a lot going for it."

2008 version
Capcom had begun development in 2007 of a downloadable video game for both the PlayStation Network on PlayStation 3 and Xbox Live Arcade on Xbox 360. A version was also planned for Microsoft Windows. Based closely on the board game of the same name from Games Workshop, it was being developed by Big Rooster, but Capcom eventually announced they were seeking new developers.

On 12 October 2008, Capcom Senior Director of Strategic Planning, Christian Svensson, announced:

This digital version would have supported up to four players, either online or offline. Including 25 different characters from the game and its expansions, it also promised additional downloadable content, such as extra characters and alternate ending conditions.

2012/2013 version 

Games Workshop and Fantasy Flight Games partnered with another video game developer to produce a video game version. Nomad Games produced a single-player version of Talisman based on the Fourth Edition rules. It is titled Talisman: Prologue. It was released 15 November 2012 for Microsoft Windows.

On 1 May 2013 Thumbstar Games Ltd released Talisman: Prologue for Android 2.2, this version also still lack multiplayer or other players directed by computer.
On 3 September 2014 new version was released that supports AI controlled characters and local multiplayer as well.

A full multiplayer version of the game, Talisman Digital Edition, was released in October 2013.

According to the review aggregate website Metacritic, Prologue received "generally favorable reviews", while Digital Edition received "mixed or average reviews".

2019 version
Nomad Games released Talisman Origins on May 16, 2019 for the PC, Mac, iOS, and Android.

References

External links
 Official website for Talisman: Digital Edition
 Official website for Talisman Origins
 Talisman Island - A fan page
 The Unofficial Talisman Computer Game

1985 video games
2012 video games
2013 video games
2019 video games
Android (operating system) games
Cancelled PlayStation 3 games
Cancelled Windows games
Cancelled Xbox 360 games
Capcom games
Games Workshop games
IOS games
MacOS games
Mobile games
Nintendo Switch games
PlayStation 4 games
PlayStation Network games
PlayStation Vita games
Role-playing video games
Talisman (board game)
Video games based on Arabian mythology
Video games based on board games
Video games developed in the United Kingdom
Windows games
Xbox One games
Xbox Series X and Series S games
ZX Spectrum games
ZX Spectrum-only games